Wittenberg is a town in Saxony-Anhalt, Germany.

Wittenberg may also refer to:

Places 
 Wittenberg (district), Saxony-Anhalt, Germany
 Wittenberg, Missouri, US
 Wittenberg, New York, US, near Johns Mountain
 Wittenberg, Wisconsin, US, a village
 Wittenberg (town), Wisconsin, adjacent to the village
 Wittenberg Mountain, Ulster County, New York, US

Other uses 
 Wittenberg (surname)
 Wittenberg University, in Springfield, Ohio, US
 University of Wittenberg, now the University of Halle-Wittenberg in Halle, Saxony-Anhalt, Germany
 Wittenberg, a 2008 play by David Davalos

See also 
 Wittenberge in Brandenburg, Germany
 Wittenburg in Mecklenburg-Vorpommern, Germany
 Wittenburg, Nova Scotia